Narayan Rao Tarale (नारायणराव तरळे; 1936–2019) was an Indian politician from Karnataka. He was a member of the Karnataka Legislative Assembly.

Biography
Tarale was elected as a member of the Karnataka Legislative Assembly from Belgaum in 1994. He was the vice president of Maratha Mandal which runs educational institution.

Tarale died on 24 November 2019 at the age of 83.

References

2019 deaths
Independent politicians in India
Karnataka MLAs 1994–1999
1930s births
People from Belagavi district
Marathi politicians